Pseudelaeodes is a genus of moths of the family Noctuidae.

Species
 Pseudelaeodes proteoides  (Kenrick, 1917)
 Pseudelaeodes sogai  Viette, 1969

References
Viette, P. 1965i. Descriptions préliminaires de nouveaux genres et espèces de Noctuidae Amphipyrinae malgaches (Lep.). - Bulletin de la Société entomologique de France 70:85–91.

Hadeninae
Moth genera
Taxa named by Pierre Viette